The MCC Bicentenary match was a five-day first-class cricket exhibition match held at Lord's Cricket Ground from 20 to 25 August 1987 (with a rest day on 23 August).  The match was in celebration of the 200th anniversary of the Marylebone Cricket Club (MCC), which had been founded in 1787, and was contested between an MCC team captained by Mike Gatting, and a "Rest of the World" team captained by Allan Border.  It featured many notable international players: with the exception of Clive Rice of South Africa (who at the time were banned from international cricket), 21 of the 22 players had played Test cricket prior to the match.

Teams

The MCC team was chosen from players competing in the County Championship, either eligible for England or as overseas players.  The Rest of the World team was formed of players from the other Test-playing sides.  England all-rounder Ian Botham was unable to take part because of an injury, while West Indies batsman Viv Richards declined to participate because of commitments to his club, Rishton, in the Lancashire League.

Match

The match was drawn after no play was possible on the final day due to rain.

Notable performances in the match included centuries from Graham Gooch, Mike Gatting and Gordon Greenidge for MCC and Sunil Gavaskar (his first at Lord's, in his final first-class match) for the Rest of the World, as well as Roger Harper's run out of Gooch.  Although the match did not have Test status, individual performances were recorded on the Lord's honours boards.

References

1987 in English cricket
1987 sports events in London
Cricket in London
First-class cricket matches
Lord's
Bicentenary match